Manuel Alejandro Medrano López (October 29, 1987, Cartagena, Colombia), known as Manuel Medrano, is a Colombian pop singer and a winner of two Latin Grammy Awards.

Start
His singing and songwriting are a way of saying thanks for supporting his family. The story of Manuel Medrano begins when he failed a school year and, as "punishment," he received a guitar. From the age of 16 he began writing songs, which motivated him to start a career as a solo artist.

For several years he played in bars in Bogota while composing his songs, which, years later, made him popular at the national level.

Recognition

In August 2014 he released "Afuera del planeta," his first independent single. Playback of the song increased gradually on national radio to the point of becoming one of the hits of the year. Thanks to this song, he was nominated twice to the Shock music awards: in the Best New Artist and Best Shock Presents categories.

In early 2015 he signed with multinational label Warner Music and, months later, released his second promotional single "Bajo el agua," which accumulated more than 75,000,000 views on YouTube and was well received in Colombia and Mexico.

In the year 2016 he won two Latin Grammy Awards: Best New Artist and Best Songwriting Album.

Manuel Medrano composes romantic music that he calls pop-cast, because it doesn't come from a specific genre, but from various influences of Latin American singer-songwriters.

Discography
 Manuel Medrano (2015)
 Eterno (2021)

Awards and nominations

Latin Grammy Awards
A Latin Grammy Award is an accolade by the Latin Academy of Recording Arts & Sciences to recognize outstanding achievement in the music industry.

|-
| rowspan=3|2016 || Manuel Medrano || Best New Artist || 
|-
| "Bajo el Agua" || Song of the Year || 
|-
| Manuel Medrano || Best Singer-Songwriter Album ||

References

1987 births
Living people
Latin Grammy Award for Best New Artist
21st-century Colombian male singers
Latin music songwriters